Lee Yun-seo (born 5 March 2003) is a South Korean artistic gymnast. She competed at the 2019 and 2021 World Championships, and she represented South Korea at the 2020 Summer Olympics and at the 2018 Summer Youth Olympics.

Junior career 
Lee made her international debut at the 2017 Junior Asian Championships where she helped the South Korean team win the bronze medal behind China and Japan. She also placed fourth in the all-around and sixth on the balance beam, and she won the bronze medal on the floor exercise behind Chinese gymnasts Li Qi and Chen Yile. She competed at the 2018 Junior Asian Championships where South Korea once again won the team bronze medal behind China and Japan. Individually, she won the bronze medal in the all-around, the silver medal on the uneven bars, and the bronze medal on the floor exercise. She was then selected to compete at the 2018 Youth Olympics in Buenos Aires. There, she qualified for the all-around final where she finished thirteenth with a total score of 48.899. She also qualified for the uneven bars final where she finished sixth with a score of 13.166. At the 2018 Voronin Cup, she won the bronze medal in the all-around and the floor exercise both behind Russian gymnasts Vladislava Urazova and Viktoria Listunova, and she won the gold medal on the uneven bars.

Senior career

2019 
Lee made her senior international debut at the American Cup and placed ninth in the all-around. She then went to the Tokyo World Cup and finished seventh in the all-around. At the Korean National Team Selection competition, she finished second in the all-around behind Kim Ju-ry. She then went to the Korea Cup and won the gold medal on the uneven bars. She was then selected to compete at the World Championships alongside Eom Doh-yun, Ham Mi-ju, Lee Eun-ju, and Yeo Seo-jeong, and they finished sixteenth in the qualification round. Individually, Lee finished twenty-eighth in the all-around and was the first reserve for the all-around final. This resulted earned her an individual spot for the 2020 Olympics. Her final competition was the Toyota International where she won the silver medal on the uneven bars behind Angelina Melnikova and the bronze medal on the balance beam behind Melnikova and Hitomi Hatakeda.

2021 
Lee did not compete in 2020 due to the COVID-19 pandemic in South Korea. She returned to competition at the postponed 2020 Olympic Games and qualified for the all-around final where she finished twenty-first with a total score of 51.632. She then competed at the Korean National Sports Festival and won the gold medal in the all-around, uneven bars, and balance beam, and she won the silver medal on the floor exercise behind Shin Sol-yi. At the World Championships, she qualified for the all-around final in tenth place and was the first reserve for the uneven bars final. In the all-around final, she finished thirteenth with a total score of 51.699.

2022 
Lee competed at the 2022 Asian Championships in June.  While there she helped South Korea place second as a team behind China.  Individually she won bronze in the all-around (behind Zhang Jin and Tang Xijing), on the uneven bars (behind Wei Xiaoyuan and Tang), and on floor exercise (behind Wu Ran and Shoko Miyata).

Competitive history

References

External links 
 

Living people
2003 births
South Korean female artistic gymnasts
Gymnasts at the 2018 Summer Youth Olympics
Gymnasts at the 2020 Summer Olympics
Olympic gymnasts of South Korea
Gymnasts from Seoul
21st-century South Korean women